Kanchipuram in history has also been known as the ghatikasthanam or place of learning. Today several educational institutions offer courses in engineering, arts and science, and medicine, in and around Kanchi.

List of Educational Institutions
Some of the Major Universities and Schools in the City are listed below.

References

Schools
Kanchipuram
Kanchipuram